Jacobus Deketh (or de Keth) (Harlingen, 1726 – Zeewijk (Almenum), 26 July 1764) was a captain in the Frisian Admiralty, one of the five admiralties of the Dutch Republic. In 1744 at the age of 18, Deketh joined the Admiralty of Amsterdam. He became a lieutenant and later extraordinary captain and sailed to the Dutch East Indies. In 1758, Deketh continued his career in the Frisian Admiralty. He became captain of a ship, Edam. He was appointed full captain of the Frisian Admiralty in 1760.

Early life and family
Jacobus Deketh was the youngest son of Jan Goverts Deket(h) and Anna Gardin(g)ius.
On 9 April 1726, he was baptized in the Great Church (Grote Kerk) in Harlingen. He had three brothers: Govardus, born 1717, Reiner, born 1719, and Everhardus, born in 1722.

Although his father's origins are unknown it is likely that he came from Jutland in Denmark. In 1701, his father got a job in the receiver-general's office of the Frisian Admiralty, and in 1721 Jacobus Deketh became receiver-general himself. His mother, Anna Gardinius, was also associated with the Frisian Admiralty, being the widow of Captain Peter Coderq, before becoming the third wife of Jan Goverts Deketh.

Career
In 1744 at the age of 18, Deketh joined the Admiralty of Amsterdam.  During his service there he first became a lieutenant and later extraordinary captain and sailed to the Dutch East Indies protecting merchant ships.
After 1758, Deketh continued his career in the Frisian Admiralty. He commanded the ship Edam. In 1759 he was appointed full captain and in 1760 he commanded the Prins Willem, a frigate with 36 guns. In this ship he escorted several convoys sailing to Italy, England and France. He made four journeys to the Mediterranean Sea between 1761 and 1763. On behalf of the Dutch Republic he undertook several diplomatic visits to Algiers. He brought gifts with him on these voyages to propitiate the Barbary pirates who at that time made the Mediterranean unsafe.

Deketh died at home in Almenum on 26 July 1764, only 38 years old.  His death is recorded on a plaque in the Grote Kerk in Harlingen. Deketh's estate included a stable, orangery, gardening shed, carriage house and farm house.  His portrait was painted on 13 July 1761 in Livorno by Ranieri Ducci.  In the painting he is surprisingly holding a book with the English title Guardian Volume 1, which during a restoration of the picture was discovered to have been a later pentimento, covering a miniature of a lady. The Fries Scheepvaartmuseum purchased the painting from a man from 's-Hertogenbosch, who was discovered to possess it when he showed it in an episode of Tussen Kunst & Kitsch, the Dutch version of the Antiques Roadshow.

References

Further reading
Journaal, gehouden door den schrijver H. van den Burch op 's Lands schip Edam, onder bevel achtereenvolgens van den kapitein F. Wijs en den commandeur J. Deketh, gedurende zijn reis naar de Middellandsche zee. 1757–1758 ship's log in two parts 14 July 1757 – 4 January 1758 and 5 January 1758  – 26 August 1758 found in the Netherlands National Archive.
Payrolls of the Prins Willem, with Captain J. Deketh. 1760–1763 Archive File
Journaal, gehouden door den schrijver J. Blom op 's Lands schip Prins Willem, onder bevel van den kapitein J. Deketh, gedurende zijn reis naar de Middellandsche zee. 25 November 1760 – 26 July 1762 Nationaal Archief, Den Haag, Admiraliteitscolleges, 1586–1795, nummer toegang 1.01.46, inventarisnummer 3346 Archive File
Journal, gehouden door den kapitein J. Deketh op 's Lands schip Prins Willem gedurende zijn reis naar de Middellandsche zee. 1761–1763 3 parts (12 Feb 1761 – 30 April 1762, 1 May 1762 – 28 Feb 1763, 1 March 1763 – 27 July 1763) Nationaal Archief, Den Haag, Admiraliteitscolleges, 1586–1795, nummer toegang 1.01.46, inventarisnummer 3348 3349 and 3350
Varend Personeel van de Friese Admiraliteit Eimert Smits FAzn, Dokkum 1994 A list of ships and captains in the Frisian Admiralty
 Prins Willem arrived on 12 March from Livorno captained by Jacobus de Keth
 Warship Prins Willem 21 March from Tessel after Livorno captained by Jacobus de Keth length 6°40min
  Twee Konvooijen zyn in deze Lentemaend uit de Havenen dezer Landen in zee geftoken Den 12 namelyk zeilde uit Tessel het Oorlogschip Prins Willem de Vyfde onder het bevel van Kapitein Jacobus de Keth om de Nederlandsche Koopvaerdyschepen near de Middelandsche Zee tot Livorno toe te geleiden.
Amsterdam den 28 December Den 27 is te Tessel uytgezeyld 's Lands schip Prins Willem Kapiteyn Jacobus de Keth na Livorno en het Oostindisch Compagnie schip de Jonge Lieven Schipper Carslen Sunniksen na Ceylon voor deze Kamer. (27 December 1762)

18th-century Dutch people
1726 births
1764 deaths
Admirals of the navy of the Dutch Republic
People from Harlingen, Netherlands
Dutch military personnel of the War of the Austrian Succession